Tustin is a city in Southern California.

Tustin may also refer to:

Places
United States
 Tustin Legacy, Tustin, California, a master-planned community
 Tustin Ranch, Tustin, California, a master-planned community
 North Tustin, California, unincorporated area north of the City of Tustin
 Tustin, Michigan
 Tustin, Wisconsin, a CDP

Other uses
Tustin (surname), a surname
Tustin High School
Tustin (Metrolink station)
Tustin Unified School District
Tustin's method, an alternate name for the bilinear transform, a digital-control approximation